Events in the year 1999 in Brazil.

Incumbents

Federal government
 President: Fernando Henrique Cardoso 
 Vice President: Marco Maciel

Governors 
 Acre: Orleir Messias Cameli (until 1 January); Jorge Viana (from 1 January)  
 Alagoas: Manoel Gomes de Barros (Mano) (until 1 January); Ronaldo Lessa (from 1 January)
 Amapa: João Capiberibe
 Amazonas: Amazonino Mendes
 Bahia: Paulo Souto (until 1 January); César Borges (from 1 January)
 Ceará: Tasso Jereissati 
 Espírito Santo: Vitor Buaiz (until 1 January); José Ignácio Ferreira (from 1 January)
 Goiás: Helenês Cândido (until 1 January); Marconi Perillo (from 1 January)
 Maranhão: Roseana Sarney
 Mato Grosso: Dante de Oliveira
 Mato Grosso do Sul: José Orcírio Miranda dos Santos (from 1 January)
 Minas Gerais: Eduardo Brandão Azeredo (until 1 January); Itamar Franco (from 1 January)
 Pará: Almir Gabriel 
 Paraíba: José Maranhão 
 Paraná: Jaime Lerner 
 Pernambuco: Miguel Arraes (until 1 January); Jarbas Vasconcelos (from 1 January)
 Piauí: Mão Santa
 Rio de Janeiro: Marcello Alencar (until 1 January); Benedita da Silva (from 1 January)
 Rio Grande do Norte: Garibaldi Alves Filho 
 Rio Grande do Sul: Antônio Britto (until 1 January); Olívio Dutra (from 1 January)
 Rondônia: José de Abreu Bianco 
 Roraima: Neudo Ribeiro Campos 
 Santa Catarina: Paulo Afonso Vieira (until 1 January); Esperidião Amin (from 1 January)
 São Paulo: Mário Covas 
 Sergipe: Albano Franco 
 Tocantins: José Wilson Siqueira Campos (from 1 January)

Vice governors
 Acre: Labib Murad (until 1 January); Edison Simão Cadaxo (from 1 January)
 Alagoas: Geraldo Costa Sampaio (from 1 January)
 Amapá: Antônio Hildegardo Gomes de Alencar (until 1 January); Maria Dalva de Souza Figueiredo (from 1 January)
 Amazonas: Samuel Assayag Hanan (from 1 January)
 Bahia: César Borges (until 1 January); Otto Alencar (from 1 January)
 Ceará: Moroni Bing Torgan (until 1 January); Benedito Clayton Veras Alcântara (from 1 January)
 Espírito Santo: José Renato Casagrande (until 1 January); Celso José Vasconcelos (from 1 January)
 Goiás: Alcides Rodrigues Filho (from 1 January)
 Maranhão: José Reinaldo Carneiro Tavares 
 Mato Grosso: José Márcio Panoff de Lacerda (until 1 January); José Rogério Sales (from 1 January)
 Mato Grosso do Sul: vacant (until 1 January); Moacir Kohl (from 1 January)
 Minas Gerais: Walfrido Silvino dos Mares Guia Neto (until 1 January); Newton Cardoso (from 1 January)
 Pará: Hélio Mota Gueiros Júnior (until 1 January); Hildegardo de Figueiredo Nunes (from 1 January)
 Paraíba: Antônio Roberto de Sousa Paulino 
 Paraná: Emília de Sales Belinati 
 Pernambuco: Jorge José Gomes (until 1 January); José Mendonça Bezerra Filho (from 1 January)
 Piauí: Osmar Antônio de Araújo (until 1 January); Osmar Ribeiro de Almeida Júnior (from 1 January)
 Rio de Janeiro: Luiz Paulo Correa da Rocha (until 1 January); Benedita da Silva (from 1 January) 
 Rio Grande do Norte: Fernando Freire 
 Rio Grande do Sul: Vicente Joaquim Bogo (until 1 January); Miguel Soldatelli Rossetto (from 1 January) 
 Rondônia: Aparício Carvalho de Moraes (until 1 January); Miguel de Souza (from 1 January)
 Roraima: Airton Antonio Soligo (until 1 January); Francisco Flamarion Portela (from 1 January)
 Santa Catarina: José Augusto Hülse (until 1 January); Paulo Roberto Bauer (from 1 January)
 São Paulo: Geraldo Alckmin 
 Sergipe: José Carlos Machado (until 1 January); Benedito de Figueiredo (from 1 January)
 Tocantins: Raimundo Nonato Pires dos Santos (until 1 January); João Lisboa da Cruz (from 1 January)

Events 
  May 10th – The television network Rede Manchete cease broadcasting, turn into RedeTV!
  November 3 – Morumbi Shopping shooting: Mateus da Costa Meira, a 24-year old medical student, kills 3 people in a theater with a submachine gun.

Births 

14 January – Emerson Royal, footballer
15 August – Paola Reis, BMX rider
8 October – Camila Rossi, rhythmic gymnast

Deaths 
24 March — Ladjane Bandeira, journalist and artist (born 1927)
18 May – Dias Gomes, dramatist (born 1922)

See also 
1999 in Brazilian football
1999 in Brazilian television

References 

 
1990s in Brazil
Years of the 20th century in Brazil
Brazil
Brazil